Worlds Beyond Worlds: The Short Fiction of John R. Fultz is a collection of fantasy short stories by American author John R. Fultz. It was first published in trade paperback and ebook by DMR Books in April 2021.

Summary
The book collects eleven short works by the author.

Contents
"Chivaine" (from Weirdbook 31, Sep. 18, 2015)
"Yael of the Strings" (from Shattered Shields,  Nov. 2014)
"Ten Thousand Drops of Holy Blood" (from Skelos no. 3, Fall 2017)
Strange Days in Old Yandrissa (Mar. 2012)
"The Gnomes of Carrick County" (from Space & Time no. 116,  Spring 2012)
"The Thirteen Texts of Arthyria" (from Way of the Wizard,  Nov. 2010)
"Daughter of the Elk Goddess" (from Deepest, Darkest Eden,  Aug. 2013)
"The Penitence of the Blade" (from The Audient Void no. 2,  Oct. 2016)
"Where the White Lotus Grows" (from Monk Punk,  2011)
"Oorg" (from The Audient Void no. 5,  Apr. 2018)
"Tears of the Elohim" (from Forbidden Futures no. 3,  Winter 2018)

References

2021 short story collections
Fantasy short story collections
DMR Books books